The City Mayors Foundation, also known as City Mayors, is an international think tank dedicated to urban affairs. It has been active since 2003 and runs the biennial World Mayor award, as well as providing pro bono consultancy services.  Unlike Eurocities and United Cities and Local Governments it is wholly independent of any city.

City Mayors has instituted a Code of Ethics for city leaders who wish to perform their duties beyond all reproach. Preamble from the Code: "Good and honest local government is the foundation of any nation that strives to provide its citizens with happiness, security and prosperity. Incompetence, corruption and misconduct in local government threaten fundamental decency in a society." The foundation also publishes books as an imprint on urban affairs.

The City Mayors Foundation commissions the trophy presented as the World Mayor Award. The trophy was designed by artist Manuel Ferrari and is handmade out of steel by the metalworker Kaspar Swankey.

History
The City Mayors Foundation was set up in 2003 by Tann vom Hove (UK/Germany), Ruth Maguire (UK), Guy Kervella (UK/France), Nick Swift (Canada) and Josh Fecht (USA). In 2004 Andrew Stevens (UK), Mayraj Fahim (USA), Tony Favro (USA) and Adriana Maciel (Mexico) joined City Mayors.

References

External links
 Official site

Municipal international relations
Online magazines published in the United Kingdom
Urban planning
Think tanks established in 2003
Magazines established in 2003